Sergio Casal and Emilio Sánchez were the defending champions but did not compete that year.

Christo van Rensburg and David Wheaton won in the final 7–6, 6–2 against Bill Behrens and Matt Lucena.

Seeds
Champion seeds are indicated in bold text while text in italics indicates the round in which those seeds were eliminated.

 Jan Apell /  Jonas Björkman (semifinals)
 Brian MacPhie /  Michael Tebbutt (quarterfinals)
 Mark Keil /  Dave Randall (first round)
 Scott Davis /  Sandon Stolle (semifinals)

Draw

References
 1996 AT&T Challenge Doubles Draw

Verizon Tennis Challenge
1996 ATP Tour